The 2008–09 Carolina Hurricanes season was the franchise's 37th season, 30th season in the National Hockey League and 11th as the Hurricanes.

Key dates prior to the start of the season:

 The 2008 NHL Draft started on June 20, 2008.

Off-season 
 June 5: After 20 seasons in the NHL and 13 as one of the most popular faces of the Hurricanes' franchise, Glen Wesley announced his retirement.
 September 11: The club announced that they have signed Eric Staal to a seven-year contract extension worth US$57.75 million.

Regular season 
 November 7: Peter Laviolette made NHL history by becoming the winningest American-born NHL coach with his 240th victory, as Carolina defeated the Ottawa Senators, 2–1.
 December 2: Peter Laviolette was fired as the head coach and Paul Maurice was rehired in his place. Ron Francis became the team's associate head coach.

The Hurricanes finished the regular season having tied the Montreal Canadiens for the most power-play opportunities, with 374.

Divisional standings 

2 points for a win, 1 for an OT or shootout loss, 0 for a loss in regulation

Conference standings

Schedule and results

Record vs. opponents 

Notes: * denotes division winner; teams in bold are in the Southeast Division; teams in italics qualified for the playoffs; points refer to the points achieved by the team whom the Hurricanes played against

 = Member of the Atlantic Division  = Member of the Northeast Division  = Member of the Southeast Division  = Member of the Central Division  = Member of the Northeast Division  = Member of the Pacific Division

Playoffs 

The Carolina Hurricanes ended the 2008–09 regular season as the Eastern Conference's sixth seed. In the first round, they defeated the New Jersey Devils following a game 7 victory following two goals with 1:20 minutes in the game from Jussi Jokinen and Eric Staal in what is known as the “Shock at the Rock”. In the second round, they would beat the Boston Bruins in 7 games following an overtime goal from Scott Walker. However, they got swept by the Pittsburgh Penguins in the Eastern Conference Finals.

Player statistics

Skaters

Goaltenders 

†Denotes player spent time with another team before joining Hurricanes. Stats reflect season totals.
‡Traded mid-season
Bold/italics denotes franchise record

Awards and records

Milestones

News 
On June 14, the Hurricanes agreed to an extension of their lease at the RBC Center by five years through to 2023-24.

Trades

Free agents

Claimed from waivers

Draft picks 
The 2008 NHL Entry Draft was in Ottawa, Ontario. The Hurricanes had the 14th overall pick

Farm teams

American Hockey League 
The Albany River Rats are the Hurricanes American Hockey League affiliate for the 2008–09 AHL season.

ECHL 
The Florida Everblades are the Hurricanes ECHL affiliate.

References 

Carolina Hurricanes seasons
C
C
Hurr
Hurr